The Valsad is one of the 182 Legislative Assembly constituencies of Gujarat state in India. It is part of Valsad district.

List of segments
This assembly seat represents the following segments,

 Valsad Taluka (Part) Villages – Malvan, Kakwadi Danti, Untdi, Jeshpor, Olgam, Vasan, Vaghaldhara, Rola, Dungri, Dharasna, Dandi, Bhagal, Chharvada, Umarsadi, Shanker Talav, Kundi, Sarodhi, Chikhla, Bhadeli Jagalala, Bhadeli Desai Party, Lilapore, Saron, Kewada, Nandawala, Vejalpore, Gundlav, Gorwada, Jujwa, Ghadoi, Dhamdachi, Tithal, Surwada, Segvi, Vashiyar, Pardi Parnera, Atak Pardi, Pathri, Chanvai, Chichwada, Dived, Magod, Magod Dungri, Atar, Meh, Bhagod, Pardi Hariya, Hariya, Binwada, Kosamba, Pardi Sondhpur, Bhagdawada, Bhomaparadi, Ronvel, Dadari, Valsad (M), Valsad (INA), Mogarwadi (CT), Nanakwada (CT), Abrama (CT), Parnera (CT), Atul (CT)

Members of Legislative Assembly

Election results

2022

2017

See also
 List of constituencies of Gujarat Legislative Assembly
 Gujarat Legislative Assembly

References

External links
 

Assembly constituencies of Gujarat
Valsad district
Valsad